Spinney Hills is a place in Leicester, England.

Spinney Hills may also refer to:
 Spinney Hills, East Quogue, a place in New York

See also
 Spinney Hill, an affluent area of Northampton